Metopoceras kneuckeri is a moth of the family Noctuidae first described by Hans Rebel in 1903. It is found in northwest Africa, Pakistan, and the United Arab Emirates.

The wingspan is about 26 mm. Adults are on wing from March to April. There is one generation per year.

The larvae probably feed on babul trees.

Subspecies
Metopoceras kneuckeri kneuckeri
Metopoceras kneuckeri gloriosa (Algeria, Morocco, Mauretania, Canary Islands)
Metopoceras kneuckeri ariefera (Oman, Bahrain, Iran, Pakistan)

External links
species info

Metopoceras
Moths described in 1903
Moths of Asia
Moths of Africa